Epidendrum floridense Hágsater (Florida star orchid) is a threatened species of orchid native to southern Florida, in the Everglades and in the region around Lake Okeechobee. It was long listed as E. difforme Jacquin, formerly considered a highly variable species but now known to be a complex of dozens of species.

Epidendrum floridense is a cespitose herb, epiphytic on various trees in swamps and forests. It has green, moth-pollinated flowers.

References

floridense
Orchids of Florida
Flora without expected TNC conservation status